Giovane Santana do Nascimento (born 24 November 2003), simply known as Giovane, is a Brazilian professional footballer who plays as a forward for Corinthians.

Club career
Born in Santa Bárbara d'Oeste, São Paulo, Giovane began his career with Red Bull Brasil, but left the club due to personal reasons, and only returned to football ahead of the 2021 season with Capivariano. He made his senior debut at the age of just 17 on 29 April 2021, coming on as a second-half substitute in a 0–1 Campeonato Paulista Série A3 away loss against Linense.

Giovane scored his first senior goal on 10 May 2021, netting the winner in a 3–2 home success over Penapolense. After eight first team appearances, he moved to Corinthians on loan on 16 July, being initially assigned to the under-20 squad.

Giovane impressed with the under-20s of Timão, and made his first team – and Série A – debut on 10 April 2022, replacing Róger Guedes in a 3–1 away win over Botafogo.

Career statistics

Honours
Brazil U20
 South American U-20 Championship: 2023

References

2003 births
Living people
People from Santa Bárbara d'Oeste
Brazilian footballers
Association football forwards
Campeonato Brasileiro Série A players
Capivariano Futebol Clube players
Sport Club Corinthians Paulista players